The 2012–13 Virginia Cavaliers men's basketball team represented the University of Virginia during the 2012–13 NCAA Division I men's basketball season. The Cavaliers, led by fourth year head coach Tony Bennett, played their home games at John Paul Jones Arena and were members of the Atlantic Coast Conference. They finished the season 23–12, 11–7 in ACC play to finish in a tie for fourth place. They lost in the quarterfinals of the ACC tournament where they lost to NC State. They received an invitation to the 2013 NIT where they defeated Norfolk State and St. John's to advance to the quarterfinals where they lost to Iowa. The 2012–2013 Cavaliers set a school record with 18 regular season home wins, finishing with an overall home record of 20–2 and a perfect 9–0 in ACC play.

Previous season
The Cavaliers finished the 2011–12 season with a record 22–10 overall, 9–7 in ACC play and lost in the quarterfinals of the ACC tournament to NC State. They were invited to the 2012 NCAA Division I men's basketball tournament where they lost in the second round to Florida.

Roster

Schedule

|-
!colspan=9 style="background:#00214e; color:#f56d22;"| Non-conference regular season

|-
!colspan=9 style="background:#00214e; color:#f56d22;"| Conference regular season

|-
!colspan=9 style="background:#00214e; color:#f56d22;"| 2013 ACC Tournament

|-
!colspan=9 style="background:#00214e; color:#f56d22;"| 2013 National Invitation Tournament

Rankings

Team players drafted into the NBA

References

Virginia Cavaliers men's basketball seasons
Virginia
Virginia
Virginia Cavaliers men's basketball team
Virginia Cavaliers men's basketball team